Maurice Louis Eugène Martenot (October 14, 1898 – October 8, 1980) was a French cellist, a radio telegrapher during the first World War, and an inventor.

Born in Paris, he is best known for his invention of the  ondes Martenot, an instrument he first realized in 1928 and spent decades improving. He unveiled a microtonal model in 1938. He also was responsible for teaching the first generation of ondes Martenot performers, including Karel Goeyvaerts, Jeanne Loriod, Georges Savaria, Gilles Tremblay, and his sister Ginette Martenot.

Martenot himself performed as an 'ondist' with the Philadelphia Orchestra under Leopold Stokowski in 1930. The 1937 World's Fair in Paris awarded him "Le Grand Prix de l'Exposition Mondiale". He taught lessons at the Paris Conservatoire during the 1940s.

A Martenot biography, in French, has been written by ondist Jean Laurendeau. His invention of the ondes Martenot is the subject of the 2013 Quebec documentary Wavemakers, in which Laurendeau also appears.

Sources

 Info.com
 Sadie, S. (ed.) (1980). The New Grove Dictionary of Music and Musicians [vol. # 11].

External links
 
 The Theremin And The Ondes Martenot.
 SOS article, Feb. 2002.
 Preoccupations, Oct. 2006.

Musicians from Paris
1898 births
1980 deaths
20th-century French musicians
20th-century French inventors
Ondists
Conservatoire de Paris alumni
Academic staff of the Conservatoire de Paris
Officiers of the Légion d'honneur
Burials at Père Lachaise Cemetery